James Thomas Hanes Jr. (born December 12, 1955) is an American politician who has served in the Alabama House of Representatives from the 23rd district since 2014.

References

1955 births
Living people
Republican Party members of the Alabama House of Representatives
21st-century American politicians